Ferenc Petrovácz (13 January 1944 – 13 August 2020) was a Hungarian sports shooter. He competed in two events at the 1968 Summer Olympics.

References

External links
 

1944 births
2020 deaths
Hungarian male sport shooters
Olympic shooters of Hungary
Shooters at the 1968 Summer Olympics
People from Baja, Hungary
Sportspeople from Bács-Kiskun County